Grevenmacher is a canton in the east of Luxembourg. Its capital is Grevenmacher, a commune with town status. The canton's name derives from its principal municipality. Neither the canton, town, or commune of Grevenmacher should be confused with the former district of Grevenmacher, one of three administrative units in Luxembourg abolished in October 2015.

Administrative divisions
Grevenmacher Canton consists of the following eight communes:

 Betzdorf
 Biwer
 Flaxweiler
 Grevenmacher
 Junglinster
 Manternach
 Mertert
 Wormeldange

Mergers
 On 1 January 1979 the former commune of Rodenbourg (from Grevenmacher Canton) was absorbed into the commune of Junglinster.  The law expanding Junglinster was passed on 23 December 1978.

Population

References

 
Cantons of Luxembourg